Ha Chachole is a village in Malaoaneng community council, Leribe district, Lesotho.

Climate
Ha Chachole has a Subtropical highland climate (Cwb) with dry, cold winters and wet, warm summers.

References

Populated places in Leribe District